Koula is a small town and commune in the Cercle of Koulikoro in the Koulikoro Region of north-western Mali. As of 2008 the commune had a population of 17953. 
It is located 18 kilometres from Koulikoro city.

References

Communes of Koulikoro Region